Laura Gimmler (born 5 December 1993) is a German cross-country skier.

She participated at the FIS Nordic World Ski Championships 2019.

Cross-country skiing results
All results are sourced from the International Ski Federation (FIS).

Olympic Games

World Championships

World Cup

Season standings

References

External links

1993 births
Living people
German female cross-country skiers
Olympic cross-country skiers of Germany
Cross-country skiers at the 2022 Winter Olympics
People from Oberstdorf
Sportspeople from Swabia (Bavaria)